William McEwan (24 October 1875 – 4 April 1934) was a Scotland rugby football player. On moving to South Africa, McEwan then also represented South Africa.

Rugby Union career

Amateur career

He also played for Edinburgh Academicals.

Provincial career

McEwan was capped for Edinburgh District.

International career

He was also capped for South Africa.

Family

He was the brother of Saxon McEwan, who was also capped for Scotland.

References

Sources

 Bath, Richard (ed.) The Scotland Rugby Miscellany (Vision Sports Publishing Ltd, 2007 )

1875 births
1934 deaths
Scottish rugby union players
Scotland international rugby union players
South Africa international rugby union players
Edinburgh District (rugby union) players
Edinburgh Academicals rugby union players
Rugby union players from Edinburgh
Rugby union forwards
British emigrants to South Africa